Taras is a male Ukrainian given name especially popular in Ukraine.  In Greek mythology, Taras (Ancient Greek: Τάρας) was the eponymous founder of the Greek colony of Taras (Tarentum, modern Taranto), in Magna Graecia (today South Italy).  The name was later modified in Byzantium after Saint Tarasios (also Saint Tarasius).  Saint Tarasios's feast day is on the Calendar of Saints, celebrated on February 25 by the Eastern Orthodox and Ukrainian Greek-Catholic Church churches, and on February 18 by the Roman Catholic Church. (This date on the Julian Calendar at present corresponds to March 10 on the Gregorian calendar).

A common version is that the name Taras means "rebellious" from Greek word "rebellion" - ταραχή (tarahi), but this version is not confirmed. In Greece name Taras is practically unknown.

The spread of the name in Ukraine is explained by its association with Taras Shevchenko, a national poet and unifying figure for the Ukrainian nation who was likely named after Saint Tarasios as he was born on March 9, 1814. 

After Taras Shevchenko, naming your child Taras came to signify the allegiance to the national cause in a Ukrainian family. 
Notable people with the name include:

. 

 Taras Bidenko (born 1980), a Ukrainian boxer 
Taras Bidiak (born 1945), a Canadian soccer player 
 Taras Borodajkewycz (1902–1984), an Austrian economics historian
 Taras Borovets (1908–1981), a Ukrainian WWII insurgency leader
 Taras Mykolayovych Boychuk (born 1966), a Ukrainian scientist
 Taras Burlak (born 1990), a Russian footballer

 Taras Chopik (born 1972), a Ukrainian footballer
 Taras Chornovil (born 1964), a Ukrainian politician
 Taras Chubay (born 1970), a Ukrainian musician and poet

 Taras Danko (born 1980), a Ukrainian wrestler
 Taras Duray (born 1984), a Ukrainian footballer
 Taras Dutko, a Ukrainian paralympic footballer

 Taras Fedorovych (died  1636), a Cossack leader
 Taras Ferley (1882–1947), a Canadian publisher and politician
 Taras Filenko, a Ukrainian musician and academic
 Taras Foremsky (born 1980), a Canadian ice hockey player

 Taras Gabora (born 1932), a Canadian violinist
 Taras Grescoe (born 1966), a Canadian writer

 Taras Hunczak (born 1932), a Ukrainian-American academic
 Taras Hryb (born 1952), a Canadian wrestler

 Taras Ilnytskyi (born 1983), a Ukrainian footballer

 Taras Kabanov (born 1981), a Ukrainian footballer
 Taras Karabin (born 1989), a Ukrainian footballer
 Taras Kermauner (1930–2008), a Slovenian author
 Taras Khtey (born 1982), a Russian volleyball player
 Taras Kiceniuk, Jr. (born 1954), an American hang glider
 Taras Kiktyov (1986–2012), a Ukrainian footballer
 Taras Kompanichenko (born 1969), a Ukrainian musician
 Taras Konoshchenko, a Ukrainian opera singer
 Taras Kozyra (born 1941), a Canadian politician
 Taras Kulakov (born 1987) also known as "CrazyRussianHacker", a Russian YouTuber.
 Taras Kuzio (born 1958), a British academic

 Taras Lazarovych (born 1982), a Ukrainian footballer
 Taras Lutsenko (born 1974), a Ukrainian footballer
 Taras Lyssenko (born 1960) of A and T Recovery, an American marine salvage expert of once lost US Navy World War II aircraft 

 Taras Maksimuk (born 1992), a Ukrainian tech YouTuber
 Taras Mychalewych (born 1945), a German artist
 Taras Mykhalyk (born 1983), a Ukrainian footballer

 Taras Natyshak (born 1977), a Canadian politician

 Taras Petrivskyi (born 1984), a Ukrainian footballer
 Taras Petrynenko (born 1953), a Ukrainian singer
 Taras Pinchuk (born 1989), a Ukrainian footballer
 Taras Protsyuk (1968–2003), a Ukrainian journalist
 Taras Puchkovskyi (born 1994), a Ukrainian footballer

 Taras Rajec (born 1988), a Ukrainian-born Slovak ice skater
 Taras Romanczuk (born 1991), a Ukrainian-born Polish footballer

 Taras Senkiv (born 1989), a Ukrainian luger
 Taras Shelest (born 1980), a Russian footballer
 Taras Shelestyuk (born 1985), a Ukrainian boxer
 Taras Shevchenko (1814–1861), a Ukrainian poet
 Taras Sokolyk, a Canadian politician and businessman
 Taras Stepanenko (born 1989), a Ukrainian footballer

 Taras Tsarikayev (born 1989), a Ukrainian footballer

 Taras Valko (born 1985), a Belarusian sprint canoer
 Taras Voznyak (born 1957), a Ukrainian writer and activist

 Taras Yastremskyy, a Ukrainian paralympic swimmer
 Taras Yavorskyi (born 1989), a Ukrainian footballer

 Taras Zaviyskyi (born 1995), a Ukrainian footballer
 Taras Zytynsky (born 1962), a Canadian ice hockey player

Fictional characters
 Taras Bulba, the protagonist of Nikolai Gogol's 1835 novel of the same name

References

Slavic masculine given names
Ukrainian masculine given names